Trisha Morton-Thomas, also known as Patricia Morton-Thomas, is an Anmatyerr woman born in the Northern Territory of Australia. She is a writer, producer, director and actor who has worked in the Australian film industry since 1998 when she appeared in Radiance, the first feature film by director Rachel Perkins.

Career 
Morton-Thomas grew up in Alice Springs and the remote Northern Territory. She started her career at the Central Australian Aboriginal Media Association (CAAMA) in 1983, where she worked as a volunteer radio announcer and later as a cadet journalist until 1990 when she moved to Darwin to work with the Australian Broadcasting Corporation there.

In 1991 Morton-Thomas moved to Sydney with her good friend Rachel Perkins, who, she says, "dragged me along with her".

In Sydney she worked with the newly formed Bangarra Dance Theatre as a sound technician, collaborating with David Page on the soundtrack for Bangarra's first ballet, Praying Mantis Dreaming. 1993 saw Trisha studying with Noel Tovey in the Uta Hagen acting technique at the Eora College for Performing Arts.

After finishing at Eora College, Morton-Thomas appeared in Radiance in 1998, directed by Perkins. She played the main character, Mae.

In 2004, she returned to Alice Springs and began working with CAAMA as a Production Manager, Producer, and Director for their film production slate.

In 2007 Morton-Thomas joined the newly established National Indigenous Television (NITV) as a commissioning editor, later being promoted to senior commissioning editor.

She was a presenter on the ABC Television show Message Stick.

In 2011 Morton-Thomas formed Brindle Films with Rachel Clements. Based in Alice Springs, Brindle films has produced feature films, documentaries and television shows. In 2020 it was confirmed that ABC and Brindle Films would partner to produce MaveriX, set in the world of junior motocross; this is set to be the largest ever local productions for the NT. It is due to be shot in Alice Springs in 2021.

Filmography 

 Radiance (1998 film) – actor
 The Old Man and the Inland Sea (2005) - post-production coordinator
 Always Have and Always Will (2006) - production coordinator
 Destiny in Alice (2007) - self 
 Willaberta Jack (2007) - development producer
 Kwatye (2007) - writer, director
 Redfern Now (2012-2013 TV series) - actor
 Utopia (2013 film) - self
 8MMM Aboriginal Radio (2015 TV series) - actor, producer, writer
 Coat of Arms (2017) - producer
 Occupation Native (2017) - producer, writer, director, self
 The Song Keepers (2017) - producer
 Nobody's Child (2017) - actor
 Finke: There and Back (2019) - producer
 Total Control (2019 TV series)- actor
 Not Just Numbers (2019) - producer 
 Robbie Hood (2019) - Indigenous consultant

Awards 
ATOM Awards (Australian Teachers of Media Awards)

 2018 – Best Indigenous Video or Website: Occupation Native (2017) (winner)

Film Critics Circle of Australia Awards

 2018 – Best Documentary: The Songkeepers (2017) (nominated)

References 

Australian film producers
Australian film directors
Australian women film directors
Australian television producers
Australian women television producers
Australian television directors
Indigenous Australian musicians
Australian screenwriters
Living people
Indigenous Australian filmmakers
People from Alice Springs
Year of birth missing (living people)
Australian women television directors